Ali Mutashar (born 7 May 1989) is an Iraqi football goalkeeper who plays for Al-Sinaa.

References

Profile on Goalzz

External links

Profile on Goalzz

Sportspeople from Baghdad
Iraqi footballers
Living people
1989 births
2011 AFC Asian Cup players
Al-Shorta SC players
Association football goalkeepers
Iraq international footballers